The genus Halictus is a large assemblage of bee species in the family Halictidae. The genus is divided into 15 subgenera, some of dubious monophyly, containing over 200 species, primarily in the Northern Hemisphere (a few species occur in South America, Asia and Africa). Most species are black or dark brown, sometimes metallic greenish-tinted, with apical whitish abdominal bands on the terga (the related genus Lasioglossum, which is otherwise often similar in appearance, has the abdominal hair bands located basally, not apically).

Many species in the genus are eusocial, with colony sizes range from very small (two to four bees) to large (>200). Nests are typically burrows in the soil, with several ovoid "cells" in which pollen mixed with nectar is provided as food for the developing larvae; a single egg is laid on a pollen mass, and the cell is sealed. In a few species, the cells are arranged in clusters resembling a honeycomb, but constructed of soil rather than beeswax.  Like most ground-nesting bees, the brood cells are lined internally with a waterproofing secretion.

A few species in the genus have extensive geographic distribution, such as Halictus rubicundus, which spans virtually the entire Holarctic region. Previously, Halictus ligatus was considered to range from Canada to Venezuela, including the Caribbean. However, genetic data show that there are at least three species previously considered within this one. One of them is restricted to Southeastern USA and the Caribbean, one is Central American, and true H. ligatus is found in northern and western North America. Common European species include Halictus quadricinctus and Halictus sexcinctus, as well as H. rubicundus. H. rubicundus is solitary at high altitudes and latitudes but has eusocial colonies in warmer areas.

Species
Species within this genus include:

Halictus acrocephalus Blüthgen, 1926
Halictus adjikenticus Blüthgen, 1923
Halictus aegypticola Strand, 1909
Halictus aeneobrunneus Pérez, 1895
Halictus aerarius Smith, 1873
Halictus aestuans Ebmer, 1978
Halictus albozonatus Dours, 1872
Halictus alfkenellus Strand, 1909
Halictus argilos Ebmer, 2005
Halictus asperatus Bingham, 1898
Halictus asperulus Pérez, 1895
Halictus atripes Morawitz, 1893
Halictus atroviridis Cameron, 1906
Halictus bagirensis Blüthgen, 1936
Halictus balearicus Pérez, 1903
Halictus berlandi Blüthgen, 1936
Halictus beytueschebapensis Warncke, 1984
Halictus brunnescens (Eversmann, 1852)
Halictus bucharicus Blüthgen, 1936
Halictus bulbiceps Blüthgen, 1929
Halictus caelestis Ebmer, 1976
Halictus carinthiacus Blüthgen, 1936
Halictus centaureae Ebmer, 1985
Halictus centrosus Vachal, 1910
Halictus cephalicus  Morawitz, 1873
Halictus chalybaeus Friese, 1910
Halictus clangulus Warncke, 1984
Halictus cochlearitarsis Dours, 1872
Halictus compressus (Walckenaer, 1802)
Halictus concinnus Brullé, 1840
Halictus confusus Smith, 1853
Halictus consobrinus Pérez, 1895
Halictus constantinensis Strand, 1910
Halictus constrictus Smith, 1853
Halictus crenicornis Blüthgen, 1923
Halictus cupidus Vachal, 1902
Halictus cyanellus (Pauly, 2008)
Halictus cypricus Blüthgen, 1937
Halictus cyrenaicus Blüthgen, 1930
Halictus desertorum Morawitz,  1876
Halictus determinandus Dalla Torre, 1896
Halictus diductus Cockerell, 1932
Halictus dissidens Pérez, 1903
Halictus dorni Ebmer, 1982
Halictus dschulfensis Blüthgen, 1936
Halictus duplocinctus Vachal, 1902
Halictus expertus Cockerell, 1916
Halictus falcinellus Warncke, 1982
Halictus farinosus Smith, 1853
Halictus fatsensis Blüthgen, 1936
Halictus ferreotus Fan, 1991
Halictus fimbriatus Smith, 1853
Halictus foanus Vachal, 1899
Halictus frontalis Smith, 1853
Halictus fulvipes (Klug, 1817)
Halictus fumatipennis Blüthgen, 1923
Halictus funerarius Morawitz,  1876
Halictus fuscicollis Morawitz,  1876
Halictus gavarnicus Pérez, 1903
Halictus gemmeus Dours, 1872
Halictus georgicus Blüthgen, 1936
Halictus gobiensis Ebmer, 1982
Halictus gordius Warncke, 1975
Halictus graecus Blüthgen, 1933
Halictus grossellus Ebmer, 1978
Halictus gruenwaldti Ebmer, 1975
Halictus harmonius Sandhouse, 1941
Halictus hedini Blüthgen, 1934
Halictus hermon Ebmer, 1975
Halictus hesperus Smith, 1862
Halictus holomelaenus Blüthgen, 1936
Halictus hotoni Vachal, 1903
Halictus humkalensis Blüthgen, 1936
Halictus icarus Ebmer, 1978
Halictus indefinitus Blüthgen, 1923
Halictus inpilosus Ebmer, 1975
Halictus intumescens Pérez, 1895
Halictus iridicolor Cameron, 1905
Halictus jaramielicus Blüthgen, 1923
Halictus jucundus Smith, 1853
Halictus kessleri Bramson, 1879
Halictus kuhlmanni (Pauly, 2008)
Halictus kuschkensis Ebmer, 1975
Halictus kusdasi Ebmer, 1975
Halictus lanei (Moure, 1940)
Halictus langobardicus Blüthgen, 1944
Halictus laticephalus Warncke, 1984
Halictus latisignatus Cameron, 1908
Halictus leleji (Pesenko, 2006)
Halictus leucaheneus Ebmer, 1972
Halictus ligatus Say, 1837
Halictus lobatus Ebmer, 1978
Halictus lucidipennis Smith, 1853
Halictus luganicus Blüthgen, 1936
Halictus lussinicus Blüthgen, 1936
Halictus lutescens Friese, 1921
Halictus maculatus Smith, 1848
Halictus magnus Ebmer, 1980
Halictus mediterranellus Strand, 1909
Halictus microcardia Pérez, 1896
Halictus minor Morawitz,  1876
Halictus modernus Morawitz,  1876
Halictus mogrensis Cockerell, 1945
Halictus mondaensis Blüthgen, 1923
Halictus mongolicus  Morawitz, 1880
Halictus monochromus Dalla Torre, 1896
Halictus morawitzi Vachal, 1902
Halictus mordacella Blüthgen, 1929
Halictus mordax Blüthgen, 1923
Halictus mucidus Blüthgen, 1923
Halictus mucoreus Eversmann, 1852
Halictus mugodjaricus Blüthgen, 1933
Halictus multicarinatus Niu, Wu & Huang, 2004
Halictus nadigi Blüthgen, 1934
Halictus nasica Morawitz,  1876
Halictus nicosiae Blüthgen, 1923
Halictus nigricutis Warncke, 1975
Halictus nikolskayae (Pesenko, 2006)
Halictus nivalis Ebmer, 1985
Halictus niveocinctulus Cockerell, 1940
Halictus nuristanicus  Pesenko, 2005
Halictus ochropus Blüthgen, 1923
Halictus opacoviridis Ebmer, 2005
Halictus opulentus Benoist, 1950
Halictus orientalis Lepeletier, 1841
Halictus palustris Morawitz,  1876
Halictus parallelus Say, 1837
Halictus paropamisos Ebmer, 1978
Halictus patellatus Morawitz,  1873
Halictus pentheri Blüthgen, 1923
Halictus persephone Ebmer, 1976
Halictus petraeus Blüthgen, 1933
Halictus pici Pérez, 1895
Halictus pinguismentus Janjic & Packer, 2001
Halictus pjalmensis Strand, 1909
Halictus placidulus Blüthgen, 1923
Halictus poeyi Lepeletier, 1841
Halictus pollinosus Sichel, 1860
Halictus ponticus Blüthgen, 1934
Halictus propinquus Smith, 1853
Halictus pruinescens Cockerell, 1937
Halictus pseudomucoreus Ebmer, 1975
Halictus pseudotetrazonius Strand, 1921
Halictus pseudovestitus Blüthgen, 1925
Halictus pulvereus Morawitz,  1874
Halictus pyrenaeus Pérez, 1903
Halictus quadricinctoides Blüthgen, 1936
Halictus quadricinctus (Fabricius, 1776)
Halictus quadripartitus Blüthgen, 1923
Halictus radoszkowskii Vachal, 1902
Halictus resurgens Nurse, 1903
Halictus rossicus Ebmer, 1978
Halictus rubicundus (Christ, 1791)
Halictus rudolphae Pesenko, 1984
Halictus rufipes (Fabricius, 1793)
Halictus sajoi Blüthgen, 1923
Halictus scabiosae (Rossi, 1790)
Halictus secundus Dalla Torre, 1896
Halictus seladonius (Fabricius, 1794)
Halictus semitectus Morawitz, 1874
Halictus semiticus Blüthgen, 1955
Halictus senilis (Eversmann, 1852)
Halictus sexcinctus (Fabricius, 1775)
Halictus simplex Blüthgen, 1923
Halictus smaragdulus Vachal, 1895
Halictus solitudinis Ebmer, 1975
Halictus squamosus Lebedev, 1910
Halictus stachii Blüthgen, 1923
Halictus subauratoides Blüthgen, 1926
Halictus subauratus (Rossi, 1792)
Halictus submodernus Blüthgen, 1936
Halictus subpetraeus Blüthgen, 1933
Halictus subsenilis Blüthgen, 1955
Halictus surabadensis Ebmer, 1975
Halictus takuiricus Blüthgen, 1936
Halictus tectus Radoszkowski, 1875
Halictus tetrazonianellus Strand, 1909
Halictus tetrazonius (Klug, 1817)
Halictus tibetanus Blüthgen, 1926
Halictus tibialis Walker, 1871
Halictus togoensis Pauly, 1998
Halictus transbaikalensis Blüthgen, 1933
Halictus tridivisus Blüthgen, 1923
Halictus tripartitus Cockerell, 1895
Halictus tsingtouensis Strand, 1910
Halictus tuberculatus Blüthgen, 1925
Halictus tumulorum (Linnaeus, 1758)
Halictus turanicus  Morawitz, 1893
Halictus turkmenorum Pesenko, 1984
Halictus vansoni Cockerell, 1935
Halictus varentzowi Morawitz, 1894
Halictus verticalis Blüthgen, 1931
Halictus vestitus Lepeletier, 1841
Halictus vicinus Vachal, 1894
Halictus virgatellus Cockerell, 1901
Halictus wjernicus Blüthgen, 1936
Halictus wollmanni Blüthgen, 1933
Halictus xanthoprymnus Warncke, 1984
Halictus yunnanicus Pesenko & Wu, 1997

References

Michener, C.D. (2007). The Bees of the World. 2nd Edition. Johns Hopkins University Press.

External links

 Halictus Identification Guide
Worldwide Species Map

 
Bee genera
Taxa named by Pierre André Latreille